This list is of the Natural Monuments of Japan within the Prefecture of Okinawa.

National Natural Monuments
As of 1 May 2021, fifty-six Monuments have been designated, including five *Special Natural Monuments.

Prefectural Natural Monuments
As of 1 May 2021, fifty Monuments have been designated at a prefectural level.

Municipal Natural Monuments
As of 1 May 2021, one hundred and twenty-three Monuments have been designated at a municipal level.

See also
 Cultural Properties of Japan
 List of Places of Scenic Beauty of Japan (Okinawa)
 List of Historic Sites of Japan (Okinawa)
 List of parks and gardens of Okinawa Prefecture

References

External links
  Nature in Okinawa
  Cultural Properties in Okinawa Prefecture
  List of Cultural Properties in Okinawa Prefecture

 Okinawa
Okinawa Prefecture